Take Me to the Sea is the first full-length release from Jaguar Love. It was released on August 19, 2008, by Matador Records. The album leaked onto the internet on July 15, 2008.
It was their last album to feature drummer J. Clark.

Track listing
 Highways of Gold - 3:39
 Bats over the Pacific Ocean - 3:44
 Jaguar Pirates - 4:31
 Georgia - 5:56
 Vagabond Ballroom - 3:51
 Humans Evolve into Skyscrapers - 3:50
 Antoine and Birdskull - 3:43
 Bone Trees and a Broken Heart - 3:38
 The Man with the Plastic Suns - 4:31
 My Organ Sounds Like... - 5:09

Trivia 
 Songs 1, 4, 7, and 9 all appeared on the Jaguar Love demos, released in August 2007.
 "Antoine and Birdskull" was originally titled "Welcome to the Birdskull Palace" and "Georgia" was titled "Georgia, Take Me to the Sea".

References

External links
"Take Me to the Sea - Independent CD review"  Released  6 April 2009 

2008 albums
Jaguar Love albums